The 2019–20 Lebanese FA Cup was intended to be the 48th edition of the national football cup competition of Lebanon. It started with the First round on 12 October 2019. Lebanese Premier League side Ahed were the defending champions.

The Lebanese Football Association suspended all competitions on 21 January 2020 due to the political and financial situation in Lebanon; this resulted in the indefinite suspension of all football matches in Lebanon. With the COVID-19 pandemic also stopping sporting activities nationwide, the 2019–20 season was officially cancelled on 28 May 2020.

Teams

First phase

First round

Second round

Second phase

Round of 16

Quarter-finals

Semi-finals

Final

Bracket
The following is the bracket which the Lebanese FA Cup resembled. Numbers in parentheses next to the score represents the results of a penalty shoot-out.

Notes

References

External links
 RSSSF

 
Lebanese FA Cup seasons
FA Cup
Lebanese FA Cup
Lebanese FA Cup